Lan Tirc (born 17 November 1994) is a Slovenian football defender who plays for Radomlje on loan from Domžale.

References

External links
UEFA profile

1994 births
Living people
Footballers from Ljubljana
Slovenian footballers
Association football defenders
NK Domžale players